West Carrollton is a city in Montgomery County, Ohio, United States. A Suburb of Dayton. The population was 13,143 at the 2010 census. It is part of the Dayton Metropolitan Statistical Area. The Great Miami River runs through the town and forms most of its northern border.

Geography
West Carrollton is located at  (39.668050, -84.247991).

Demographics

2010 census
As of the census of 2010, there were 13,143 people, 5,973 households, and 3,378 families living in the city. The racial makeup of the city was 86.8% White, 8.9% African American, 0.3% Native American, 1.1% Asian, 0.9% from other races, and 2.0% from two or more races. Hispanic or Latino of any race were 2.6% of the population.

There were 5,973 households, of which 27.3% had children under the age of 18 living with them, 37.4% were married couples living together, 13.4% had a female householder with no husband present, 5.7% had a male householder with no wife present, and 43.4% were non-families. 35.1% of all households were made up of individuals, and 10.7% had someone living alone who was 65 years of age or older. The average household size was 2.18 and the average family size was 2.81.

The median age in the city was 37.5 years. 21.1% of residents were under the age of 18; 9.7% were between the ages of 18 and 24; 29.3% were from 25 to 44; 25.4% were from 45 to 64; and 14.5% were 65 years of age or older. The gender makeup of the city was 48.2% male and 51.8% female.

2000 census
As of the census of 2000, there were 13,818 people, 6,134 households, and 3,704 families living in the city. The population density was 2,190.7 people per square mile (845.5/km). There were 6,562 housing units at an average density of 1,040.3 per square mile (401.5/km). The racial makeup of the city was 92.59% White, 5.21% African American, 0.21% Native American, 1.18% Asian, 0.01% Pacific Islander, 0.51% from other races, and 1.30% from two or more races. Hispanic or Latino of any race were 1.44% of the population.

There were 6,134 households, out of which 27.4% had children under the age of 18 living with them, 45.0% were married couples living together, 11.4% had a female householder with no husband present, and 39.6% were non-families. 32.0% of all households were made up of individuals, and 8.6% had someone living alone who was 65 years of age or older. The average household size was 2.24 and the average family size was 2.83.

In the city the population was spread out, with 22.2% under the age of 18, 10.1% from 18 to 24, 32.8% from 25 to 44, 22.5% from 45 to 64, and 12.4% who were 65 years of age or older. The median age was 35 years. For every 100 females, there were 92.3 males. For every 100 females age 18 and over, there were 88.6 males.

The median income for a household in the city was $40,964, and the median income for a family was $48,832. Males had a median income of $38,382 versus $25,591 for females. The per capita income for the city was $20,721. About 6.1% of families and 7.4% of the population were below the poverty line, including 12.9% of those under age 18 and 6.9% of those age 65 or over.

History
West Carrollton was originally called Carrollton, and under the latter name was laid out in 1830. This changed was said to have occurred in response to the amount of mail erroneously received for the second city of Carrollton, OH. Before its current city symbol, the symbol of West Carrollton was a simple pentagon. This resembled the city's rich transportation history, as the small town at one point had five forms of transport running through it: train, canal, riverboats, trolleys and cars.

Education
West Carrollton has a public library, a branch of the Dayton Metro Library.

References

External links
 City of West Carrollton official website
 West Carrollton Historical Society

Cities in Montgomery County, Ohio
Cities in Ohio